The women's freestyle 65 kilograms is a competition featured at the 2022 World Wrestling Championships, and was held in Belgrade, Serbia on 13 and 14 September 2022. The qualification rounds were held on 13 September while medal matches were held on the 2nd day of the competition. A total of 14 wrestlers competed in this event, limited to athletes whose body weight was less than 65 kilograms. 

This freestyle wrestling competition consists of a single-elimination tournament, with a repechage used to determine the winner of two bronze medals. The two finalists face off for gold and silver medals. Each wrestler who loses to one of the two finalists moves into the repechage, culminating in a pair of bronze medal matches featuring the semifinal losers each facing the remaining repechage opponent from their half of the bracket.

Asian champion and 2021 World Wrestling Championships runner-up Miwa Morikawa of Japan won the gold medal after beating Long Jia from China 2–0 after six minutes. The Japanese managed to win by scoring a stepout and an activity point, both in the first period and defending her lead for the rest of the match.

Mallory Velte of the United States of America and Koumba Larroque from France shared the bronze medals. Velte beat Mimi Hristova of Bulgaria 11–2 in one of the bronze medal bouts, while France's Larroque recorded a close 3–2 win on points over the second seed Elis Manolova of Azerbaijan to win the other bronze medal.

Results

Main bracket

Repechage

Final standing

References

 Results book

External links
Official website

Women's freestyle 65 kg
2022 in women's sport wrestling